Coca-Cola Citra is a beverage made by The Coca-Cola Company. The design shows yellow and green stripes, and a pair of citrus fruits resembling a lemon and a lime. It is accompanied by Coca-Cola Light with Citra in Mexico and Japan, and Diet Coke with Citra in Labasa.

The drink itself entered the Coca-Cola company's portfolio when the brand was acquired during Coca-Cola's acquisition of the Parle groups soft drink portfolio, in India. Coca-Cola has re-introduced the drink into the Indian market since lemon-lime flavoured drinks are the most popular type in the market.

Countries where Citra has been introduced
 Mexico - 2005 on a trial basis
 New Zealand - 2005 for a limited time, discontinued in 2006
 New Zealand - reintroduced in March 2007, discontinued in September 2007
 Japan - officially launched on May 29, 2006, including 1.5 litre, 500 ml, and 300 ml varieties

See also
 Coca-Cola

References

Coca-Cola brands
Food and drink introduced in 2005
Lemon-lime sodas